The New Brunswick Hawks were a professional ice hockey team based in Moncton, New Brunswick. Home games were played at the Moncton Coliseum. They were a member of the American Hockey League (AHL) between 1978 and 1982. The Hawks operated as a minor league affiliate of the Chicago Black Hawks and the Toronto Maple Leafs, with a winning record each of four seasons.

The Hawks won the F. G. "Teddy" Oke Trophy twice for regular season division championships in 1979–80, and 1981–82. New Brunswick finished first overall in 1981–82, and won the Calder Cup by defeating the Binghamton Whalers four games to one in the finals. In the summer of 1982, the Black Hawks pulled out of the team and the Maple Leafs moved the franchise to St. Catharines, Ontario to establish the St. Catharines Saints as their farm team. However, the same off-season the Edmonton Oilers purchased an AHL franchise and formed the Moncton Alpines to replace the departed team.

History

The Moncton-based New Brunswick Hawks were established in 1978 as members of the American Hockey League (AHL), and were jointly operated by the Chicago Black Hawks and the Toronto Maple Leafs as their farm team. Maple Leaf Gardens Limited (MLGL) and the Black Hawks each owned half of the franchise.

By 1980, Harold Ballard, owner of the Leafs, had decided that they needed a developmental team of their own, with a spokesperson citing the limited number of roster spots as the rationale for the move.  MLGL launched the Cincinnati Tigers in the old Central Hockey League in 1981 to serve as their own affiliate, while retaining their share of the New Brunswick Hawks.  However, after the Tigers averaged only 1,500 fans and lost $750,000 in their first season, the Leafs folded the Tigers in the spring of 1982.  That same summer, with Chicago having already pulled out of New Brunswick in favour of affiliating with the Springfield Indians on their own, the Maple Leafs announced that they would not operate the team in Moncton the following year after they couldn't come to terms with the city on a new arena lease, even though the team had the fifth highest attendance in the league.

The Maple Leafs wanted to relocate the team closer to Toronto, with both St. Catharines and Niagara Falls in Ontario potential destinations for the franchise.  When MLGL applied to the AHL to relocate the New Brunswick Hawks to St. Catharines, the nearby Buffalo Sabres initially blocked the move due to objections to a team moving into their territory without prior discussions with them.  However, following protests by fans in St. Catharines and threats by Ballard to suspend the Moncton franchise to prevent another AHL team from playing in the city and to sue the Sabres and NHL for $20 million, the relocation was approved unanimously and the franchise became the St. Catharines Saints, serving as the Maple Leafs' primary affiliate.  At the same AHL Board of Governors meeting, the Edmonton Oilers received approval to purchase a new AHL franchise to replace the departed Hawks in Moncton, leading to establishment of the Moncton Alpines as their affiliate that fall.

Coaches
 1978–79 – Eddie Johnston
 1979–80 – Joe Crozier & Lou Angotti
 1980–81 – Doug Carpenter
 1981–82 – Orval Tessier

Players
Rocky Saganiuk won the Les Cunningham Award in 1978–79 as the league's Most Valuable Player, in its inaugural season. The following season in 1979–80, Darryl Sutter won the Dudley "Red" Garrett Memorial Award as Rookie of the Year. Sutter went on to have a career in the NHL, with the Chicago Blackhawks. He later became head coach of the Los Angeles Kings. Four different players were honoured in 1981–82 with league awards. Mike Kaszycki won three awards, the Les Cunningham Award as most valuable player, the John B. Sollenberger Trophy as top scorer, and the Fred T. Hunt Memorial Award for sportsmanship and perseverance. Dave Farrish was voted top defenceman winning the Eddie Shore Award, and goaltenders Bob Janecyk & Warren Skorodenski won the Harry "Hap" Holmes Memorial Award for the league's lowest goals against average.
Jack O'Callahan, who was a member of the 1980 Winter Olympics United States "Miracle on Ice" national team, played two seasons for the New Brunswick Hawks before playing for the Chicago Blackhawks in the NHL.

Season-by-season results

Regular season

Playoffs

See also
List of ice hockey teams in New Brunswick

References

 
Toronto Maple Leafs minor league affiliates
Maple Leaf Sports & Entertainment
Chicago Blackhawks minor league affiliates
Ice hockey clubs established in 1978
Ice hockey clubs disestablished in 1982
Sport in Moncton
1978 establishments in New Brunswick
1982 disestablishments in New Brunswick